Ghalia Benali (born December 21, 1968) is a Tunisian singer, songwriter, writer, and graphic designer. Her music has been noted for its links to multiple genres and defining contemporary Arabic music. Benali's southern Tunisian upbringing and fascination with Middle Eastern and Arab legendary artists is palpable in her music style. Her voice has been dubbed as multicultural and polymorphic.

Born in Brussels (Belgium), and raised in Zarzis, Tunisia, Benali embarked on her music career in the early 90s, during the rise of world music phenomena that exposed her to different cultures and philosophies. After finishing her science and mathematics studies at the age of 19, Benali returned to Brussels to study graphic design at the Institut Saint-Luc of Graphic Arts. Soon she became a widely recognized songstress in Europe, and in 2012 she made her debut on an Arab stage.

Some of the most prominent projects Benali has worked on are Kafichanta, Wild Harissa, Romeo and Leila, Al Palna, and The Indian Hadra. Benali has performed songs by Oum Kalthoum, Allegory of Desire, and MwSOUL. In addition, she has acted, and collaborated with international bands such as The Spy from Cairo, Mad Professor, and The Metropole Orchestra.

Early life
Benali was born in Brussels, Belgium on December 21, 1968, to Ali Benali, a physician and cytologist, and Najia Somai, a beautician. She has three younger brothers, Zied, Taher, and Bechir. At the age of four, Benali's father ended his medical studies and decided to return to the family's homeland, where she grew up in Zarzis, a coastal town in southeastern Tunisia. As a young girl, she started exploring her melodic fascination with recitations of the Quran, Indian, and Egyptian cinema, in addition to Middle Eastern and Arab musicians such as Oum Kalthoum, Sabah Fakhri, and Adib AlDayikh.

With the support of her mother, Benali used to play dress-up at family gatherings and perform for her guests, yet due to her shy nature, singing for a crowd was rather challenging. She would occasionally pretend to be interviewed in front of her bedroom's mirror. Before becoming an artist and musician, she hoped for a job that would allow her to travel and explore the world and even considered becoming a flight attendant. After finishing her science and mathematics studies at the age of 19, Benali returned to Brussels to study graphic design at the Institut Saint-Luc of Graphic Arts to express herself through imagery and artistry. After graduating, Benali became an independent artist and graphic designer. Soon her passion for music was further nourished after performing at her friend's birthday, which she considers the day it all started.

Career beginnings 
On December 21, 1993, Benali celebrated her 25th birthday, first on stage and the 10th anniversary of a venue called Amadeus. She performed with a band she met on stage, together with J.P. Gebbler, a Belgian jazz player, classical western musicians, and a flamenco band. In June 1994, CASA CAIUS invited her to tour in Portugal, where she performed in a line-up of 6 concerts in some of the most iconic historical places in North Portugal for the Roland company.

Four years later, the musician collaborated with stylist Vanessa Neirynck in the international styling competition "Brothers Cup" in China and came in second. Later on, she left for Rajasthan, India, to learn dancing. In 1999, Benali was invited by Kunsten-festival-des arts to perform in a concert in Bazaar in Brussels on a project with a new band that later on will be known as Timna/Wild harissa.

Music ventures

Kafichanta 
Hoping to present the music of Arab cabaret to Europeans and remain in touch with her origins, Benali performed with the trio "Kafichantas" with lute player Moufadhel Adhoum, and percussionist Azeddine Jazouli. The project was a means to take westerners on a journey of Arabic culture.

Wild Harissa and Nada 
While experimenting with acting and cinema, the songstress released her first two albums, "Wild Harissa", a collaboration with Timna in 2001, and "Nada" in 2002.

Romeo and Leila 
In 2003, Benali started working on a multidisciplinary project that included music, story-telling, dancing, and graphics. "Romeo and Leila" is a Benali autobiography, for every mythical character mentioned in the fictional tale refers to someone she met in her real-life journey. As a young artist, Benali left her country and safe haven, searching for a love she only dared dream of. Facing different cultures, beliefs, and social pressures, her departure was anything but mundane. In the tale of Romeo and Leila, Benali is both the hero and heroine. Both rising from different worlds, the only thing that could bring them together in harmony is acceptance. The short story is about a secluded and overly-protected princess, and five short journeys she has to take to reach the divine perfection found in love. During her hunt for five pearls that would be her liberator, she learns the lesson of a lifetime. Originally written in French and translated to English and Arabic, "Romeo and Leila" shows us that love is rebirth, never death, as tradition and literature tend to carve in our subconscious. The tale was performed by Benali as a musical in Belgium. The personal project was not recorded with a music label, but with the help of the Palestinian founder of the Amal Festival in Santiago de Compostela in Spain, Ghaleb Jaber, and the Flemish community of Belgium. The album was released in 2006.

Al Palna and The Indian Hadra 
Ghalia Benali has always been spellbound by the Indian culture and its visionary art. The music, costumes, colorful fabrics, and choreography have mesmerized her to the extent that she would listen to radio stations broadcasting Indian music during school classes. Years later, the songstress felt the need to infuse her Arabic roots with the Indian culture in the one way she can truly express her soul, music. In 1991, Benali attended the Indian school in Brussels where she met sitar player Bert Cornelis. After a long jamming session, the song "Bharat" came to life, which evolved over the years to set the tone of the "Al Palna" album. The name of the album signified the amalgamation of the Arabic and Indian cultures. The word Al means the in Arabic, while Palna means cradle in Hindi. The album was released in 2008, followed by a tour in India in 2009. The intimate audience of avid music and poetry-recitation lovers continuously appeared entranced with the uniting classical Arabic and Indian tunes. Spiritual poetry about Love, also known as Ghazal, was a commonly performed genre. Later on, Al Plana was reborn in Egypt as ‘The Indian Hadra’ with violin player Ayman Asfour, and Arabic percussionist Ayman Mabrouk. The Indian sitar and tablas, with the chanting of Sufi Arabic words, took the audience on a divine journey. It was a project meant for liberal souls and minds. The music is closer to an Athan, which is a call to pray for God.

Ghalia Benali sings Oum Kalthoum 
Benali has always been fascinated by Oum Kalthoum, the most prominent of all Egyptian and Arab female singers. Listening to "Al Atlal" song as a child has shaped her passion for music. The love for the music legend ran in the family, where her parents hung a picture of Oum Kalthoum on their bedroom wall. Benali, being the imaginative child she was, believed the photo was of her grandmother. Years later, Benali remained as passionate as ever about her fictional and honorary grandmother, deciding to embrace the love the Arab world has for her music icon and pay tribute as a loyal granddaughter. Yet instead of giving the audience a reiterated performance, she created her own rendition of the renowned music that captured her music style, Tunisian essence, and spirituality. The Oum Kalthoum album, which consisted of five songs, was recorded at the Jet studio in Brussels in 2008. Participating in this project were double bassist Vincent Noiret, rek player Azeddine Jazouli, and oud player Moufadhel Adhoum. The album appeared under the Dutch label "Music and Word" in 2010. The project was a huge success in Europe, with thousands attending the shows regardless of the language barrier. Benali has turned it into an experience rather than a performance, with her signature body language that translated the lyrics beyond Europeans’ comprehension.

The Voice 
By the year 2012, Benali had already made a name for herself in Europe, yet she still yearned for a connection with Arab audiences which led to her next career move. "The Voice" talent show on the MBC channel was premiering the same year and the management team contacted Benali to participate in their first season. She left quite an impression during her breakthrough appearance on the show while performing "Ya Mesafer Wahdak" by Mohamed Abdel Wahab. However, she felt her free-spirited performance and unique cultural-blending style were not the traditional styles the show was looking for. Yet, for the first time, Benali came face-to-face with the Arab audience and sensed what they were looking for in an artist.

Allegory of Desire 
Later in 2013, Benali collaborated with Zefiro Torna and Vocalconsort Berlin on a new project. Inspired by The Song of Songs, a series of lyrical poems organized as a dialogue between a young woman and her lover in the last section of the Tanakh or Hebrew Bible, the Allegory of Desire came to life. The music involved solo-voiced madrigals accompanied by instruments, vocal duets, and trios, a women's choir and polyphonic settings by composers such as Hildegard of Bingen, De Machaut, Dunstable, Agricola, Lassus, Grandi, Sances, Monteverdi, Schütz, Buxtehude, and J. Ch. The project created an inspiring dialogue between cultures, with narrated texts by Sufi poets such as Rabaa Al-Adawia and a young aspiring generation of poets such as Egyptian Abdallah Ghoneim and Mohamed Zakaria. Lyrics were written and composed by Benali herself. The international cast took their project to Mechelen, Berlin, Hamburg, Nürnberg, Winterthur, Sevilla, and Vilnius, and an album was released in 2016 by Warner classics.

MwSOUL 
It was during the Arab Spring that people from all over the Middle East felt connected on a spiritual level no matter which country they came from. Tunisian-born and Brussels-based, Benali felt an otherworldly homogeneity with freedom seekers from far away and it felt as if she was destined for her new career venture. MwSOUL, translated as connected, was Benali's next music project. It is considered her most Sufi and spiritually oriented work. Most of the lyrics were written by her, yet the "MwSOUL" hit was written by the aspiring Egyptian poet, Abdallah Ghoneim. It all started during the revolution when Egypt shut down the internet and Benali felt a loss of connection with the youth. Ghoneim sent her a poem about souls and hearts intertwining, regardless of their inability to physically meet. The songstress tried to understand her own emotions regarding deaths, crimes, and conspiracies and seek the true essence of the events. To her, freedom was never about overthrowing political figures, so instead, Benali immediately started recording the powerful poem tackling the individual's path towards liberty. MwSOUL is a project that blends classic and contemporary Arab lyrics. The music using breath (brass) and beat (percussion) was written by Benali, referring to the soul and heart, arranged by Belgian group Mâäk, with whom Benali has been collaborating for over 20 years, and led by trumpeter Laurent Blondiau with the excellent oud of Moufadhel Adhoum. Benali graced the stage in the MwSOUL performance, creating a pulse that is organically provided by oud, flute, trumpet, sax, sousaphone, & drums, along with her dark and commanding voice and horns that add punchy rhythmic riffs. From moments of calm voice tagged solely with oud or sousaphone to full-throated vocal notes, the performance is a roller coaster of beats and emotions. The album was recorded on the W.E.R.F label and was released in May 2017.

MWSOUL Art Foundation 
After years of struggling with unorganized management, Benali finally decided to take things into her own hands and founded an outlet to exhibit her art, music, and literature. The MWSOUL Art Foundation is a non-profit establishment that aims at raising awareness by reviving and connecting authentic cultural roots through different kinds of arts.

Art projects

One Hour Before the Gods Awake 
Immediately after finishing the MwSOUL project, Benali created a manuscript called "One Hour Before the Gods Awake" that includes 59 short fictional tales accompanied by 59 artworks. The images and texts tell an imaginary and fantasy-oriented version of real unfolding events. From reiterating old mythologies and legends about the beginning of humankind to recreating newer and more passionate versions, the manuscript is nothing but uninhibited creativity. Benali turned her passion into an exceptional electromusical project, with songs and videos that captured a strong message.

The artwork's line and structure is created by Ghalia Benali, while the text – or the tales – is by contemporary writers from all over the Arab world. The storyline has 59 images, with 59 texts representing the 59 minutes it took humanity to attain awareness.

Draw Me a Doll Project
Fascinated as a child by "The Little Prince" novel by Antoine de Saint-Exupéry, the renowned literature quote "Draw me a sheep," has constantly consumed Benali's thoughts. For years, the musician failed to purchase the doll of her dreams, so instead she made one. Trying hard to find each doll the face it was meant to have, she opted to leave them unidentified, which eventually matched the persona she always imagined.

The concept of "Draw Me a Doll" project is that what a person chooses to wear might suggest his/her character, yet it will never embody the soul and authentic nature. The project tackles themes such as freedom, inspiration, beauty, skin color, diversity, acceptance while highlighting Benali's opposition to prejudice, racism, and body shaming. The art dolls are made from spare scraps of cloth material, stuffed with raw sheep wool. They can be white, black, red, or green. The fabrics used for the dresses are vintage silk, lace, and leather, with gold and silver accessories. The scrawny arms and legs are similar to botanical roots.

Slides of life 
As a child with a wild imagination, Benali virtually traveled the world in her head without ever leaving the comfort of her home. Feeling chased out of her safe haven, Benali refused to accept the reality of selling her house which embodied her dreams and memories. Mourning her past, the songstress started showing a fascination in creating miniature worlds, with their own fantasy and drama, in small boxes. Each box is a slide of life, a vulnerable little world that is a cabinet of curiosity. The observer feels sympathy and recognizes himself in the tiny figures, relating to their ignorance and frailty. There is only enough space for one viewer at a time, which gives a sense of privacy and intimacy.

Benali chose the dolls used in architectural modelling to represent her characters. The boxes have a vintage feel to them, like most of Benali's work, which is about memories and souvenirs. All the objects, fabrics, jewelry, and tiny details are covered in dirt, torn, and shredded. Benali aimed at recycling un-useful objects in our daily life, to give them a new purpose and meaning. The dioramas, as the musician named them, incorporate a painted background that employ a false perspective and carefully modifying the scale of objects.

Underskin 
One of the most spiritual and philosophical projects Benali has worked on is "Underskin". During an extremely rough patch in the musician's life, feelings such as anger, jealousy, hatred, and sadness emerged, along with many unanswered questions. The spiritual aspect of the project was depicted in all the different answers found that carried the same message. This was a message of visualizing life's experience, standing in the middle of a universe, connecting the land and sky, and just being one with the surroundings. It all started in 2005 when Benali envisioned existence as a tree that gave out life through branches that intertwined and flourished. The songstress's pregnancy was portrayed as a tree with its roots entrenched in a hemisphere that represented a mother's belly. The deeply embedded roots in the soil represented a myth regarding the unborn's personality, hidden deep inside the songstress's body.

Benali used ink, needle, and a vintage pencil plume and chose one of her paintings to be tattooed on her body. The message of "Underskin" is that one is the tree, the branches and the fruit. Inside oneself lies a fountain that never dries out.

Musical style and influences 
Benali's voice has been dubbed as multicultural and polymorphic. Spending the first four years of her life in Brussels, Benali's parents found comfort away from their homeland in music. Her mother highly appreciated French, Indian, and Egyptian music, while her father had an inclination towards classical music such as Beethoven, in addition to Iraqi and Jordanian songs.

Benali's music has been noted for its links to multiple genres. Benali's southern Tunisian upbringing and fascination with Middle Eastern and Arab legendary icons such as Oum Kalthoum, Abdel Basit Abdel Samad, and Adib ElDayekh (AlMashayekh school) are palpable in her music style. Other influential sources on Benali's mystical and spiritual art are Inayat Khan and Sri Aurobindo, one of the greatest thinkers in India, and the cultures of flamenco and gypsies of Rajasthan.

Discography 
 2001 – "Wild Harissa" album, a collaboration with Timna, released by the German Label network.
 2002 – "Nada" album produced by Ghalia Benali.
 2002 – Viewmaster produced by "Cultuurhuis De Warande".
 2003 – Two songs featured in "In My Tree" by Nicolas Thys.
 2006 – Romeo and Leila, released by the Dutch label Music & Words.
 2007 – "Po Cheri" with Hungarian gypsy band Romano Drom.
 2007 – A collaboration with Urban Trad on the album "Erbalunga".
 2008 – Featured in Spellbound album by Giacomo Lariccia.
 2008 – Al Palna, recorded by the Belgian Radio and released by the Dutch label Music & Words.
 2010 – Ghalia Benali sings Oum Kalthoum released by the Dutch label Music & Words.
 2010 – Featured in Spy of Cairo album by Secretly Famous.
 2011 – Featured in Oriental Express album with Nara Noïanc.
 2016 – "Allegory of Desire", a Berlin vocal consort which is a collaboration between Zefiro Torna and Ghalia Benali and released by Label Warner.
 2017 – "MwSOUL", a Ghalia Benali & MÄAk collaboration, released by the Belgian jazz label DE WERF.
 2017 – Featured in Pondora et Cie album by Nisia.
 2017 – Featured in Les Impénétrables album by Les Impénétrables Trio.
 2019 – Fatwa pour l'amount
 2020 – Featured in "Hysteria (Wuhan Fight Dub)" single by Dub Mentor, released on EnT-T.

Filmography 
 2000 – Acting debut playing the role of Meriem in Moufida Tlatli's movie "La Saison des Hommes".
 2002 – Second movie appearance in "Swing" by Tony Gatliff, which was a dedication to the gypsy jazz guitarist with some allusions to the legendary Django Reinhardt.
 2013 – Guest appearance in Egyptian Ramadan TV series "Farah Laila" by Khaled El Hagar.
 2014 – Special contribution to the movie "Jareedy", set in Egypt's Nubia, by composing and singing the main song of the movie "Jareedy".
 2016 – Nominated by Leyla Bouzid to play the role of a suppressed mother of an 18-year-old rebellious daughter in the award-winning movie "As I Open My Eyes".

Awards and nominations
 2008 – Won the World of Music Award for best world music song, presented by an independent British organization "We Are Listening”
 2013 – Named one of the best 10 concerts by The New York Times
 2016 – Won the best actress award in Spain by Women for Africa Foundation for her role in "As I open my eyes" by Leyla Bouzid
 2017 – Nominated by Les Magrittes du Cinema for "Best Hope Actress" for her role in "As I open my eyes" by Leyla Bouzid

References

Further reading
"Tunisian Diva Ghalia Benali: 'Of souls that are eternally connected". Al-Ahram.
"Get it girl! Ghalia Benali brings flower power into Middle East music scene". Al Bawaba.
"Tunisian singer Ghalia Benali returns to Cairo for another soulful performance". Al Bawaba.
"Check out Ghalia Benali singing against gender-based violence". Al Bawaba.
"Ghalia Benali and Bert Cornelis: Al Palna". Sing Out!.

External links 

Musicians from Brussels
Living people
1968 births
20th-century Tunisian women singers
21st-century Tunisian women singers